Eucalyptus kenneallyi, commonly known as Kenneally's white gum, is a species of tree that is endemic to two small islands off the Kimberley coast of Western Australia. It has smooth bark, lance-shaped adult leaves, flower buds in groups of seven, white flowers and cylindrical fruit.

Description
It has smooth white to brownish bark that is shed in large plates or flakes.

Taxonomy and naming
Eucalyptus kinneallyi was first formally described in 2000 by Ken Hill and Lawrie Johnson from a specimen collected by Kevin Kinneally on Storr Island. The description was published in the journal Telopea. The specific epithet honours Kevin Francis Kenneally.

Distribution and habitat
Kenneally's white gum is only known from Storr and Koolan Islands near the north Kimberley coast, where it grows in thin sandy soils on hard siliceous outcrops.

Conservation status
This eucalypt is classified as "Priority One" by the Government of Western Australia Department of Parks and Wildlife meaning that it is known from only one or a few locations which are potentially at risk.

See also

List of Eucalyptus species

References

Eucalypts of Western Australia
Trees of Australia
kenneallyi
Myrtales of Australia
Plants described in 2000
Taxa named by Lawrence Alexander Sidney Johnson
Taxa named by Ken Hill (botanist)